Jack Guittet (born 12 January 1930) is a French fencer. He won a bronze medal in the team épée event at the 1964 Summer Olympics.

References

External links
 

1930 births
Living people
Sportspeople from Casablanca
French male épée fencers
Olympic fencers of France
Fencers at the 1960 Summer Olympics
Fencers at the 1964 Summer Olympics
Olympic bronze medalists for France
Olympic medalists in fencing
Medalists at the 1964 Summer Olympics